The 1981 season was Molde's 20th season in the second tier of Norwegian football and their first since their relegation from 1. divisjon in 1980. This season Molde competed in 2. divisjon (second tier) and the Norwegian Cup.

In the league, Molde finished in 2nd position in 2. divisjon group B, 2 points behind winners Sogndal and qualified for promotion play-offs. Molde won promotion to the 1982 1. divisjon after winning the play-offs on goal difference against Brann and Pors.

Molde participated in the 1981 Norwegian Cup. Molde reached the fourth round where they were eliminated by Bryne. Molde lost the fourth round 2–4 on away ground after extra time.

Squad
Source:

Friendlies

Competitions

2. divisjon

Results summary

Positions by round

League table

Promotion play-offs

Results

Molde won the qualification round and was promoted to the 1. divisjon.

Norwegian Cup

Squad statistics

Appearances and goals
Lacking information:
Appearance statistics from league games in rounds 1 (Mo away), 13 (Mo home) and 16 (Bergsøy away) are missing.
Three goalscorers from league games in round 11 (Kristiansund away) are missing.
Two goalscorers from Norwegian Cup round 1 (Velledalen/Ringen away) are missing.

 

|}

Goalscorers

See also
Molde FK seasons

References

External links 
rsssf.no

1981
Molde